This is a list of electoral results for the Electoral district of Stirling in Western Australian state elections.

Members for Stirling

Election results

Elections in the 2000s

Elections in the 1990s

Elections in the 1980s

Elections in the 1970s 

Preferences were not distributed between the National Alliance and Liberal candidates for Stirling.

Elections in the 1960s

Elections in the 1950s

References

Western Australian state electoral results by district